The 2022 National Premier League is the 48th season of the National Premier League, the top division football competition in Jamaica. The season kicked off on 16 January 2022 and is set to end on 13 June 2022 which would later, go towards a playoff round between the top six teams in the league.

Cavalier F.C. are the defending champions, having won their 2nd National Premier League title which was the first league title in almost 40 years.

Team 
Due to Financial reasons UWI F.C. withdrew from the league, prior to the shortened 2021 National Premier League season and were relegated back to their regional Super league. Montego Bay United were promoted back to the league for this upcoming season.

League table

Results

Season Statistics

Top scorers

References 

2021–22 in Caribbean football leagues